Grayson Murphy (born February 4, 1999) is an American professional basketball player. He played college basketball for the Belmont Bruins of the Ohio Valley Conference (OVC).

High school career
Murphy played basketball for Independence High School in Thompson's Station, Tennessee. As a junior, he averaged 18.6 points per game, 5.6 rebounds, 5.1 assists and 3.8 steals per game, while receiving Trophy House/Gateway Tire Player of the Year honors for Williamson County. Murphy was also named District 11-AAA MVP and led his team to a district title, earning tournament MVP.  In a Region 6-AAA win over McGavock High School as a junior, Murphy had 43 points, 12 assists, nine rebounds and nine steals. In his senior season, he averaged 19.7 points, 8.9 rebounds, 5.2 assists and 3.1 steals per game. Murphy left as his school's all-time leader in points, rebounds, assists and steals. He committed to playing college basketball for Belmont over offers from Austin Peay, Lipscomb and Troy, among others.

College career
Murphy redshirted his first year at Belmont after breaking his right foot during a pick-up game with teammates prior to the season. In four games that season, he averaged 4.5 points per game. On February 28, 2019, he broke the program single-game NCAA Division I record with 16 assists in a 112–67 win over UT Martin. As a freshman, Murphy averaged 9.6 points, 6.5 assists and 4.4 rebounds per game. He set Belmont's Division I record for assists by a freshman, with 214. As a sophomore, he averaged 9.8 points, 7.4 rebounds, 6.2 assists and 2.6 steals per game, earning First Team All-Ohio Valley Conference (OVC) and Defensive Player of the Year honors. He set program single-season records in steals (86) and assist to turnover ratio (3.69), and was the only player with at least 240 rebounds, 200 assists and 80 steals. On February 13, 2021, he registered the first triple-double of Belmont's NCAA era, with 13 points, 12 rebounds and 10 assists in a 73–58 win over Morehead State. On February 27, Murphy posted a career-high 24 points, 13 rebounds and seven assists in an 89–82 overtime loss to Morehead State. In his junior season, he averaged 10.9 points, eight rebounds, 5.8 assists and 2.3 steals per game, and repeated as First Team All-OVC and Defensive Player of the Year. As a senior, Murphy was again named to the First Team All-OVC.

Career statistics

College

|-
| style="text-align:left;"| 2017–18
| style="text-align:left;"| Belmont
|| 4 || 0 || 12.5 || .450 || .000 || .000 || 1.5 || 1.8 || .5 || .0 || 4.5
|-
| style="text-align:left;"| 2018–19
| style="text-align:left;"| Belmont
|| 33 || 33 || 29.8 || .491 || .355 || .563 || 4.4 || 6.5 || 1.6 || .1 || 9.6
|-
| style="text-align:left;"| 2019–20
| style="text-align:left;"| Belmont
|| 33 || 33 || 29.8 || .522 || .338 || .571 || 7.4 || 6.2 || 2.6 || .2 || 9.8
|-
| style="text-align:left;"| 2020–21
| style="text-align:left;"| Belmont
|| 28 || 28 || 30.5 || .589 || .357 || .742 || 8.0 || 5.8 || 2.3 || .4 || 10.9
|- class="sortbottom"
| style="text-align:center;" colspan="2"| Career
|| 98 || 94 || 29.3 || .528 || .341 || .601 || 6.3 || 6.0 || 2.1 || .2 || 9.8

Personal life
Murphy's father, Scott, played college basketball for Austin Peay. His older brother, Patrick, played basketball for Martin Methodist College and Western Kentucky. His cousin, Luke, plays college baseball as a pitcher for Vanderbilt.

References

External links
Belmont Bruins bio

1999 births
Living people
American men's basketball players
Basketball players from Tennessee
People from Franklin, Tennessee
Belmont Bruins men's basketball players
Phoenix Hagen players
Point guards